Prophysa is a genus of freshwater snails, an aquatic gastropod molluscs from Mesozoic.

Species
Species within the genus Prophysa include:
 Prophysa bristovii (De Loriol, 1865)

References

Prehistoric gastropod genera